Charlotte Prodger (born 1974) is a British artist and film-maker who works with "moving image, printed image, sculpture and writing". Her films include Statics (2021), SaF05 (2019), LHB (2017), Passing as a great grey owl (2017), BRIDGIT (2016), Stoneymollan Trail (2015) and HDHB (2012). In 2018 she won the Turner Prize.

Early life
Prodger was born in Bournemouth in 1974. Between 1997 and 2001, she studied Fine Art (Studio Practice and Contemporary Critical Theory) at Goldsmiths, University of London, and between 2008 and 2010 she studied Masters in Fine Art at the Glasgow School of Art.

Career
Prodger works with "moving image, printed image, sculpture and writing". Her film Stoneymollan Trail is a compilation of scenes made since the late 1990s using "old camcorder, HD and more recent iPhone footage". Her film BRIDGIT (2016) addresses issues of queer identity and was shot using an iPhone.

In 2017 Prodger undertook the Berwick Artists' Moving Image Residency, where she developed LHB, a new single-screen work for cinema that premiered at Berwick Film & Media Arts Festival 2017.

In 2018 she won the Turner Prize for an exhibition of BRIDGIT and Stoneymollan Trail at Bergen Kunsthall in Norway. Between 11 May – 24 November 2019 she was presented by Scotland + Venice at the Arsenale Docks as part of the 58th Venice Biennale. As part of the Collateral Events, Scotland + Venice  commissioned Charlotte Prodger to create SaF05 (2019), a new single channel video work to be screened across seven cinemas and art centres in Scotland. The UK premiere was held at The Tower Digital Arts Centre in Argyll & Bute on 27 June 2019. The work shown is the last of a trilogy that began with Stoneymollan Trail (2015) followed by BRIDGIT (2016). The work was curated by Linsey Young in partnership with Alexia Holt of Cove Park, where the work was developed.

She is represented by Hollybush Gardens, London and Kendall Koppe, Glasgow.

Films
HDHB (2012) in collaboration with Corin Sworn – 10 minutes
Stoneymollan Trail (2015) – 43 minutes
BRIDGIT (2016) – 32 minutes
Passing as a great grey owl (2017) – 6 minutes
LHB (2017) – 20 minutes
SaF05 (2019) – 39 minutes

Exhibitions

Solo exhibitions
handclap/punchhole, Kendall Koppe, Glasgow, 2011
Untitled, Intermedia CCA, Glasgow International, 2012
Charlotte Prodger/Jason Loebs, Essex St, New York, 2012
Percussion Biface 1-13, Studio Voltaire, London, 2012
Sunday Art Fair, Kendall Koppe, London, 2013
Nephatiti, Glasgow International Director's Programme, 2014
Markets, Chelsea Space, London, presented by The Block, 2014
Frieze Art Fair, Koppe Astner, Randall's Island, New York, 2015
Stoneymollan Trail, Temple Bar Gallery, Dublin, 2015
8004-8019, Spike Island, Bristol, UK, 2015
Charlotte Prodger, Kunstverein Düsseldorf, Germany, 2016
BRIDGIT, Hollybush Gardens, London, 2016
SUBTOTAL, SculptureCenter, New York, 2017
BRIDGIT/Stoneymollan Trail, Bergen Kunsthall, Bergen, Norway, 2017/2018
Colon Hyphen Asterix, Hollybush Gardens, London, 2018
Scotland + Venice, 58th International Art Exhibition, La Biennale di Venezia, 2019
SaF05, Stedelijk Museum, Amsterdam, Netherlands, 2021
Blanks and Preforms, Kunst Museum Winterthur, Switzerland, 2021

Group exhibitions 

 What We Make With Words, CCA, Glasgow, 2011
 Soundworks, ICA, London, 2012
 Frozen Lakes, Artists Space, New York, 2013
 Costume: Written Clothing, Tramway, Glasgow, 2013
 Holes In The Wall, Kunsthalle Freiburg, 2013
 Annals of The Twentieth Century, Wysing Arts, Cambridge, 2014
 The Secret Life, Murray Guy, New York, 2015
 An Interior that Remains an Exterior, Künstlerhaus Graz, 2015
 British Art Show 8, Leeds Art Gallery, Edinburgh Inverleith House, Norwich University of the Arts, Southampton City Art Gallery, 2015
 Weight of Data, Tate Britain, London, 2015
 British Art Show 8, Leeds Art Gallery, Edinburgh Inverleith House, Norwich University of the Arts, Southampton City Art Gallery, 2016
 Ewig Weibleche, Koppe Astner, Glasgow, 2017
 Coming Out: Sexuality, Gender and Identity, Birmingham Museum and Art Gallery, 2017
 Turner Prize 2018, Tate Britain, London, 2018
 Always Different, Always the Same: An essay on Art and Systems, Bündner Kunstmuseum, Chur, 2018
Migrating Worlds: The Art of the Moving Image in Britain, Yale Center for British Art, New Haven, 2019
Nine Lives, The Renaissance Society, University of Chicago, 2020
Dislocations, Hunterian Art Gallery, Glasgow, 2021
Language Is a River, Monash University Museum of Modern Art, Melbourne, Australia, 2021

Collections
Prodger's work is held in the following public collections:
Arts Council Collection, UK: 1 film, BRIDGIT (as of December 2018)

Personal life
Prodger lives and works in Glasgow.

References

1974 births
Living people
British women artists
British contemporary artists
Alumni of the Glasgow School of Art
Alumni of Goldsmiths, University of London
Artists from Bournemouth
British video artists
Women video artists
Queer artists
21st-century LGBT people